Bunger, Buenger, or Bünger may refer to:

People
Richard Bunger Evans (born 1942), American composer and pianist; also known as Richard Bunger
Harold Bunger (1896–1941), American chemist and researcher
Stan Bunger (born 1956), American broadcast journalist
Christian Heinrich Bünger (1782–1842), German surgeon and anatomist
Walter L. Buenger (born 1951), American historian

Other
Bunger Hills, a coastal range on the Knox Coast in Wilkes Land in Antarctica
Bunger, alternate name for firecracker
Bunger, a fictional creature found in Bugsnax

See also
Bung (disambiguation)